The Embassy of Ivory Coast in London is the diplomatic mission of Ivory Coast in the United Kingdom. The Ivory Coast also maintains a Commercial & Economic Section (Commodities) named "The Permanent Representation of Cote d'Ivoire to International Commodity Organisations" located at 33 Cavendish Square in Central London.

References

Ivory Coast
Diplomatic missions of Ivory Coast
Ivory Coast–United Kingdom relations
Grade II listed buildings in the City of Westminster
Belgravia